Giulio Carlo, Count Fagnano, Marquis de Toschi (26 September 1682 — 18 May 1766) was an Italian mathematician. He was probably the first to direct attention to the theory of elliptic integrals. Fagnano was born in Senigallia (at the time spelled "Sinigaglia"), and also died there.

Life
Giulio Fagnano was born to Francesco Fagnano and Camilla Bartolini in Senigallia (at the time spelled "Sinigaglia") in 1682.

Fagnano had twelve children. One, Giovanni Fagnano, was also well-known as a mathematician. Another of Fagnano's children became a Benedictine nun.

In 1721, Fagnano was made a count by Louis XV; in 1723, he was appointed gonfaloniere of Senigallia and elected to the Royal Society of London; in 1745 he was made a marquis of Sant' Onofrio.

Mathematical work

Fagnano made his higher studies at the Collegio Clementino in Rome, and there won great distinction — except in mathematics, to which his aversion was extreme. Only after his college course did he take up the study of mathematics; but then, without help from any teacher, he mastered mathematics from its foundations. Most of his important researches were published in the Giornale de' Letterati d'Italia.

Fagnano is best known for investigations on the length and division of arcs of certain curves, especially the lemniscate (cf. Lemniscate elliptic functions); this seems also to have been in his own estimation his most important work, since he had the figure of the lemniscate with the inscription "Multifariam divisa atque dimensa Deo veritatis gloria" engraved on the title-page of his Produzioni Matematiche, which he published in two volumes (Pesaro, 1750), and dedicated to Pope Benedict XIV. The same figure and words "Deo veritatis gloria" also appear on his tomb.

Failing to rectify the ellipse or hyperbola, Fagnano attempted to determine arcs whose difference is rectifiable.
The word "rectifiable" meant at that time that the length can be found explicitly, which is different from its modern meaning. He also pointed out the remarkable analogy existing between the integrals which represent the arc of a circle and the arc of a lemniscate. He also proved the formula

Some mathematicians objected to his methods of analysis founded on the infinitesimal calculus. The most prominent of these were Viviani, De la Hire and Rolle.

References

1682 births
1766 deaths
People from Senigallia
18th-century Italian mathematicians
17th-century Italian mathematicians
Fellows of the Royal Society